Edward Konietzny (2 May 1904 – 2 July 1981) was a Polish footballer. He played in one match for the Poland national football team in 1927.

References

External links
 

1904 births
1981 deaths
Polish footballers
Poland international footballers
Place of birth missing
Association footballers not categorized by position